Domnall mac Ruaidrí Ua Conchobair (1102–1106) was King of Connacht.

Domnall was the second son of Ruaidrí na Saide Buide to assume the kingship. He deposed Domnall mac Tigernáin Ua Ruairc, been assisted by aid of Muirchertach Ua Briain, who was his father Ruaidrí's brother-in-law. Domnall was the last Ua Ruairc of Breifne to become king of Connacht.

Ua Briain, in 1106, had Domnall deposed by his younger brother, Toirdelbach Ua Conchobair, who was Muirchertach's nephew. Domnall's precise fate is unknown. Toirdelbach would in time go to great lengths to erase the descendants of his uncles and brothers from the genealogical record, leaving the succession open only to Ua Conchobair's descended from himself.

References

 West or H-Iar Connaught Ruaidhrí Ó Flaithbheartaigh, 1684 (published 1846, ed. James Hardiman).
 Origin of the Surname O'Flaherty, Anthony Matthews, Dublin, 1968, p. 40.
 Irish Kings and High-Kings, Francis John Byrne (2001), Dublin: Four Courts Press, 
 Annals of Ulster at CELT: Corpus of Electronic Texts at University College Cork
 Byrne, Francis John (2001), Irish Kings and High-Kings, Dublin: Four Courts Press, 

People from County Galway
12th-century Irish monarchs
1106 deaths
Domnall
1102 births